Sing for Hope is a non-profit organization founded by opera singers Monica Yunus and Camille Zamora. The two New York City based vocalists and alumnae of the Juilliard School established Sing for Hope as a resource for New York artists who want to use their art to give back to their community.

The Sing for Hope Pianos project, one of New York City's largest public art projects, brings artist-painted pianos to the parks and public spaces of the city. The pianos often feature formal and impromptu concerts and have been likened to an open festival of music bringing together New York’s culturally diverse population. Following their two-week public residency, The Sing for Hope Pianos are donated to schools, healthcare facilities, and community centers, enriching lives for years to come. CBS News wrote that the project was "reminding us all of the power of music to inspire and unite."

List of artist partners

 Tituss Burgess
 Renée Fleming
 Nia Franklin
  Curt Hansen
 Laurel Harris
 Erika Henningsen
 Hugh Jackman
 Chilina Kennedy
 Billie Jean King
 Mary-Louise Parker
 Daphne Rubin-Vega
Lea Salonga
Nadine Sierra
 Carla Stickler

References 

Charities based in New York City
Non-profit organizations based in New York City
Organizations established in 2003
Arts organizations based in New York City